= The Crucial Matter =

- Directed by: Gbenga Awoyemi
- Produced by: Supo Ayokunle
- Starring: Kolade Segun-Okeowo; Kayode Babalola; Bose Ann Olufayo; Rotimi Amodu; Sam Odusolu
- Release date: 2020
- Country: Nigeria
- Language: English

The Crucial Matter is a 2020 Nigerian gospel film written and directed by Gbenga Awoyemi and produced by Supo Ayokunle under the sponsorship of Nigerian Baptist Drama Association (NIBDRA). The movie stars faith-based movie actors and actresses such as Kolade Segun-Okeowo, Kayode Babalola, Bose Ann Olufayo, Rotimi Amodu and Sam Odusolu.

== Synopsis ==
The movie addresses indiscipline and recklessness that exist in the society which is in tandem with the Christian belief.

== Premiere ==
The movie was premiered at Molete Baptist Church, Ibadan on 8 March 2020.

== Cast ==
- Kolade Segun-Okeowo
- Kayode Babalola
- Bose Ann Olufayo
- Rotimi Amodu
- Sam Odusolu
- Yemi Adepoju
- Adeyinka Aderibigbe
